Mary Aloe is an American film and television producer, focusing on faith-based, action and drama. She is the owner of Aloe Entertainment based in Beverly Hills, California, which has produced movies including Battle in Seattle, When a Man Falls in the Forest, While She Was Out, Numb, Tortured, and The Princess and the Marine.

Education and early career
Aloe was born in Philadelphia, Pennsylvania, as the youngest of three girls. She moved to Los Angeles to attend the University of Southern California, where she participated with other students on a music magazine titled "Rock", distributed in 35 countries.  Her interest in journalism led her to work as an entertainment reporter for Us Weekly and Entertainment Weekly Radio.

Aloe moved to New York and transitioned into producing talk shows, such as CBS's Geraldo.  She later moved back to the west coast where she produced a newsmagazine show at Paramount television called Hard Copy.  She went on to produce reality TV shows and specials such as The Susan Powter Show (Multimedia Inc), Caught in the Act (NBC/Dick Clark Productions) and Case Closed (USA Network).

Aloe's first executive producer credit was for the Columbia TriStar television movie The Princess and the Marine.  She followed with producing feature-length films such as When a Man Falls in the Forest, Numb, Battle in Seattle, Tortured, While She Was Out and Hollywood & Wine.

Personal life
Aloe participates in charities that support children, women, and animals.  She is an active supporting member of The Pasadena Humane Society, and Pit Bull Rescue.

Filmography (producer)

Partial list of film credits
 Downtown: A Street Tale (2004)
 Battle in Seattle (2007)
 Numb (2007)
 When a Man Falls in the Forest (2007)
 While She Was Out (2008)
 Tortured (2008)
 Cabin Fever 2: Spring Fever (2009)
 The Ascent (2010)
 Hollywood & Wine (2010)
 10,000 Saints (2015)
 Mothers and Daughters (2016) 
 Wild Oats (2016) (with The Weinstein Company and The Exchange)
 55 Steps (2017)
 Beast of Burden (2017)
 Mara (2018)
 Dear Dictator (2018)
 The Brawler (2019)
 Killerman (2019)
Wander (2020)
 Disturbing the Peace (2020)

Television
A Current Affair TV series (producer)
Geraldo (1991–1992) TV series (producer) CBS
Hard Copy (1992–1993) TV series (producer) Paramount Television
Caught in the Act (1993) TV (producer) Dick Clark Productions/NBC
Case Closed (1993) TV series (producer) USA Network
The Susan Powter Show (1994–1995) TV (executive producer) Multimedia Entertainment (syndicated)
All Together Now (1995) TV pilot (producer) Columbia Tri-Star Television
The Princess and the Marine (2001) TV Movie (exec. producer) Columbia Pictures/NBC
Room 401 (2008) TV series (exec. producer, partnered with Ashton Kutcher) MTV

References

External links
 
 

Businesspeople from Philadelphia
American women film producers
American film producers
University of Southern California alumni
Living people
Year of birth missing (living people)